The following lists include countries by total reported abortions, annual abortions and rates according to reports from governments and statisticians.

The CDC or Guttmacher estimates do not account for medical abortions outside a clinic. Some analysts have estimated the cumulative amount of abortions in the US may have reached between 70 and 80 million and that up to two million abortions occurred annually. The U.S.S.R. had more than 200 million reported abortions throughout its 69-year history according to the Johnston's Archive. A Guttmacher Institute study found 15.6 million abortions occur each year in India. Some analysts have estimated that cumulatively more than a hundred million abortions have taken place in the country.

Guttmacher and United Nations Report

See also
Abortion in the United States by state

References

Abortion by country
abortion statistics